Protein Tob2 is a protein that in humans is encoded by the TOB2 gene.

TOB2 belongs to the TOB (see TOB1; MIM 605523)/BTG1 (MIM 109580) family of antiproliferative proteins, which are involved in the regulation of cell cycle progression.[supplied by OMIM]

Interactions
TOB2 has been shown to interact with CNOT7.

References

Further reading